Raphael Laux is a German professional footballer who plays as a goalkeeper for Hessenliga club TuS Dietkirchen.

References

External links
 

1991 births
Place of birth missing (living people)
Living people
German footballers
Association football goalkeepers
SV Wehen Wiesbaden players
3. Liga players
Regionalliga players
Hessenliga players